United States gubernatorial elections were held in 1930, in 33 states, concurrent with the House and Senate elections, on November 4, 1930 (September 8 in Maine).

Results

See also 
1930 United States elections
1930 United States Senate elections
1930 United States House of Representatives elections

References

Notes 

 
November 1930 events